The 1995 Football League Trophy Final (known as the Auto Windscreens Shields Trophy for sponsorship reasons) was the 12th final of the domestic football cup competition for teams from the Second and Third Division of the Football League. The match was played at Wembley on 23 April 1995, and was contested by Birmingham City and Carlisle United. Birmingham City won the match 1–0, with Paul Tait scoring the winning goal in extra time. The match was the first at Wembley to be decided by the golden goal rule.

Match details

External links
Official website

EFL Trophy Finals
Football League Trophy Final 1995
Football League Trophy Final 1995
Football League Trophy Final